Eugen Wacker (sometimes written as Evgeny Vakker; born 18 April 1974) is a German-born Kyrgyzstani cyclist, who last rode for UCI Continental team . At the 2004 Summer Olympics, he competed in the road race and time trial. In April 2017, he was suspended until February 2018 for testing positive for meldonium.

Major results

2000
 1st  Overall Herald Sun Tour
2001
 1st  Overall Szlakiem Grodów Piastowskich
 1st Stage 12 (TTT) Herald Sun Tour
 3rd Melbourne to Warrnambool Classic
 7th Overall Tour de Beauce
1st Stage 1 (TTT)
2002
 National Road Championships
1st  Road race
1st  Time trial
 2nd  Time trial, Asian Games
 6th Overall Sachsen Tour
2003
 1st  Time trial, UCI B World Championships
 National Road Championships
1st  Road race
1st  Time trial
 3rd Duo Normand (with Artem Botchkarev)
2004
 National Road Championships
1st  Road race
1st  Time trial
2005
 9th Overall Tour of China
2006
 2nd  Time trial, Asian Games
2007
 Asian Road Championships
1st  Time trial
10th Road race
 National Road Championships
1st  Road race
1st  Time trial
 3rd  Time trial, UCI B World Championships
 3rd Overall Kerman Tour
 5th Chrono Champenois
 9th Overall Presidential Cycling Tour of Turkey
1st Stage 4
2008
 1st  Time trial, Asian Road Championships
 National Road Championships
1st  Road race
1st  Time trial
 4th Memorial Davide Fardelli
 7th Chrono des Nations
 10th Chrono Champenois
2009
 National Road Championships
1st  Road race
1st  Time trial
 1st Stage 4 President Tour of Iran
 3rd  Time trial, Asian Road Championships
 6th Overall Tour de Singkarak
 7th Chrono des Nations
 8th Memorial Davide Fardelli
2010
 National Road Championships
1st  Road race
1st  Time trial
 2nd  Time trial, Asian Games
 2nd Memorial Davide Fardelli
 3rd  Time trial, Asian Road Championships
 4th Overall Tour de East Java
2011
 1st  Time trial, Asian Road Championships
 National Road Championships
1st  Road race
1st  Time trial
2012
 1st  Time trial, Asian Road Championships
 National Road Championships
1st  Road race
1st  Time trial
 5th Memorial Davide Fardelli
2013
 National Road Championships
1st  Road race
1st  Time trial
 3rd  Time trial, Asian Road Championships
2014
 2nd  Time trial, Asian Games
 2nd  Time trial, Asian Road Championships
2015
 National Road Championships
1st  Road race
1st  Time trial
 2nd Overall Tour of Al Zubarah
1st Stage 3
 Asian Road Championships
4th Time trial
9th Road race
 10th Overall Sharjah International Cycling Tour
2016
 5th Time trial, Asian Road Championships
2017
 4th Time trial, Asian Road Championships

References

External links
 

Kyrgyzstani male cyclists
Kyrgyzstani people of German descent
1974 births
Living people
Olympic cyclists of Kyrgyzstan
Cyclists at the 1996 Summer Olympics
Cyclists at the 2000 Summer Olympics
Cyclists at the 2004 Summer Olympics
Asian Games medalists in cycling
Cyclists at the 1994 Asian Games
Cyclists at the 1998 Asian Games
Cyclists at the 2002 Asian Games
Cyclists at the 2006 Asian Games
Cyclists at the 2010 Asian Games
Cyclists at the 2014 Asian Games
Cyclists at the 2018 Asian Games
Medalists at the 1994 Asian Games
Medalists at the 1998 Asian Games
Medalists at the 2002 Asian Games
Medalists at the 2006 Asian Games
Medalists at the 2010 Asian Games
Medalists at the 2014 Asian Games
Asian Games silver medalists for Kyrgyzstan
Asian Games bronze medalists for Kyrgyzstan